The Nilgiris barb (Hypselobarbus dubius), also called the cock fish,  is a tropical species of freshwater cyprinid fish. It is native to India. It is potamodromous, benthopelagic, and less than 25 cm long.

References

Footnotes 
 

Hypselobarbus
Fish described in 1867